If the Gods Laugh is a 1925 romantic adventure novel by the British writer and explorer Rosita Forbes. It is set against the backdrop of the Italian colonization of Libya.

Film adaptation
In 1927 it was adapted into the American silent film Fighting Love directed by Nils Olaf Chrisander and starring Jetta Goudal, Victor Varconi and Henry B. Walthall.

References

Bibliography
 Goble, Alan. The Complete Index to Literary Sources in Film. Walter de Gruyter, 1999.
Liggins, Emma & Nolan, Elizabeth. Women's Writing of the First World War. Routledge, 2019.
 Munden, Kenneth White. The American Film Institute Catalog of Motion Pictures Produced in the United States, Part 1. University of California Press, 1997.
 Teo, Hsu-Ming. Desert Passions: Orientalism and Romance Novels. University of Texas Press, 2012.
 Watson, George & Willison, Ian R. The New Cambridge Bibliography of English Literature, Volume 4. CUP, 1972.

1925 British novels
Novels by Rosita Forbes
British romance novels
British adventure novels
Novels set in Libya
Novels set in Italy
British novels adapted into films